Zobah or Aram-Zobah was an early Aramean state mentioned in the Hebrew Bible, which extended north-east of biblical King David's realm. 

A. F. Kirkpatrick, in the Cambridge Bible for Schools and Colleges (1896), places it broadly between Damascus and the Euphrates. It is thought by some to have extended from the Beqaa Valley along the eastern side of the Anti-Lebanon Mountains, reaching Hamath to the north and Damascus to the south, making it at one time a state of considerable importance.

In the Hebrew Bible
In I Samuel, the kings of Zobah were said to have fought with Israelite king Saul. Kirkpatrick suggests that "the 'kings' were apparently independent chiefs", but by the time of King David there was a single king, Hadadezer bar Rehob. Later, King Hadadezer bar Rehob allied with Ammon against King David, who defeated Zobah and made the kingdom tributary to Israel. In this war, Arameans from across the Euphrates came to Hadadezer's aid. Upon the accession of Solomon, Zobah became independent of Israel (compare  et seq.).

The chapter-heading of Psalm 60 in the New King James Version refers to Zobah. In the Revised Standard Version and the New American Bible (Revised Edition), the reference is to Aram-Zobah.

In Mesopotamian sources
After the 10th century BCE, Zobah is not mentioned in the Hebrew Bible, but the city of Subiti, which is mentioned in the annals of Ashurbanipal as having been conquered by him in the 7th century BCE, is probably identical with it (compare Schrader, "K. B." ii. 217). The same city is mentioned in some broken cuneiform lists of towns in connection with Hamath and Damascus.

Medieval Rabbinical sources
From the 11th century, it was common Rabbinic usage to apply the term "Aram Zobah" to the area of Aleppo, and this is perpetuated by Syrian Jews to this day. However, Rabbi Saadia Gaon (882‒942 CE), in his Judeo-Arabic translation (Tafsīr) of the Book of Psalms, has identified Aram-zobah with Nisibis.

Identification attempts
Based on the biblical narrative, primarily from the books of Kings and II Samuel, Berothai, a city belonging to Hadadezer is identified by many with Berothah, which was between Hamath and Damascus. Zobah was probably located near this city, though Joseph Halévy claims to have identified Zobah with Chalcis. On the later view, the area in question would be found in the far north of Syria and parts of Turkey.

Some sources indicate that Zobah city is the modern city of Homs in Syria, or Anjar in Lebanon's Bekaa Valley. In later Assyrian documents it may have been named a provincial center derived from the recently incorporated city of Damascus, which might be Deir Khabiyah west of Al-Kiswah.

According to Edward Lipiński, the location of the capital city of Ṣoba corresponds to the present archaeological site of Tell Deir in the Beqaa Valley of modern-day Lebanon.

See also
Aleppo Codex, Hebrew Bible manuscript called in Hebrew "Keter Aram-Zoba", meaning "Crown of Aleppo"
Aram-Damascus, another Iron Age Aramean kingdom
Hamath-zobah, biblical city
Homs, city in Syria

References

Bibliography

 
Schrader, K. B. ii. 121 et seq;
Delitzsch, Wo Lag das Paradies? pp. 279 et seq.

Aramean cities
Aramean states
Ancient Syria
History of Aram (region)
Hebrew Bible places
Former populated places in Syria